Samadiyeh may refer to:
 Samadiyeh, Khuzestan
 Samadiyeh, Razavi Khorasan